Ali Bayat (also Romanized as ‘Ali Bayat) is a village in Bibi Sakineh Rural District, in the Central District of Malard County, Tehran Province, Iran. At the 2006 census, its population was 546, in 142 families.

References 

Populated places in Malard County